Barbour County Schools is the operating school district within Barbour County, West Virginia. Its main office is located in Philippi.

Board of Education
Barbour County Schools is run by the Barbour County Board of Education, consisting of the following elected members:
Joanne McConnell, President
David Everson, Vice President
Jared Nestor
Ron Phillips
Adam Starks

Schools

High schools
Philip Barbour High School , Philippi

Middle schools
Belington Middle School , Belington
Philippi Middle School , Philippi

Elementary/Middle Schools
Kasson Elementary/Middle School , Moatsville

Elementary schools
Belington Elementary School , Belington
Junior Elementary School , Junior
Philippi Elementary School , Philippi

Former Schools
Mt. Vernon Elementary School
Volga-Century Elementary School

References

External links
Barbour County Schools

School districts in West Virginia
Education in Barbour County, West Virginia